Ryan Camenzuli (born 8 September 1994) is a Maltese footballer who plays as a midfielder for Ħamrun Spartans.

Club career
Camenzuli made his debut for Birkirkara on 30 January 2011, replacing Terence Vella in added time at the end of a 1–0 away win over Vittoriosa Stars. On 6 May, in his only other game of the season, he started in a 0–3 loss at Floriana, making way for Carl Pulo after 57 minutes.

On 28 April 2012, he scored the first goal of his career, finishing off a 2–0 home win over Hibernians. The following season, he contributed three goals in 25 games as Birkirkara won the league.

Camenzuli scored twice and was named man of the match in Birkirkara's 4–2 home win over Sliema Wanderers on 7 March 2015.

He signed with Birkirkara again in the summer 2017, but in January 2018, Camenzuli was banned for match-fixing for one year. After the suspension, he was sold back to Floriana, which was confirmed on 15 January 2019.

International career
He made his debut for the Malta national football team on 25 March 2015, replacing Steve Borg in added time at the end of a 0–3 friendly defeat to Georgia at the Mikheil Meskhi Stadium in Tbilisi.

Honours
Birkirkara
Maltese Premier League: 2012–13
Maltese Super Cup: 2014, 2015

References

External links
Profile at Floriana FC

Living people
1994 births
Association football midfielders
Maltese footballers
Malta international footballers
Birkirkara F.C. players
Floriana F.C. players
Maltese Premier League players